"" is a Greenlandic song used as an ethnic anthem by the self-governing Kalaallit of Greenland. It was officially recognised by the government in 1979. Both lyrics and melody were composed by Jonathan Petersen, who also wrote the musical score for Greenland's 1916-adopted national anthem "Nunarput utoqqarsuanngoravit."

History 
The song was written by Greenlandic organist and piano teacher Jonathan Petersen, probably during or after a stay in Denmark in 1910–1911, during which he passed his organ exam with distinction. It was originally set to the tune of the Danish national anthem, "Der er et yndigt land". Petersen wrote an original composition for the song around 1920, which retained the repetition of the third line of each verse, as in "Der er et yndigt land".

In 1979, when home rule was granted to Greenland, the song was adopted as a national anthem, alongside "Nunarput, utoqqarsuanngoravit". In 1985, it was translated into Danish by theologian Mads Lidegaard. Both the Greenlandic and Danish versions have been published in the Højskolesangbogen.

Lyrics

Notes

References

Greenlandic music
Danish anthems
North American anthems
Regional songs
National anthem compositions in F major